Relatos macabrones is a Mexican sketch comedy series that premiered on Las Estrellas on 31 August 2020. It stars Freddy Ortega and Germán Ortega. Production of the series began on 15 June 2020. Each episode is composed of three sketches that revolve around horror stories, with a dose of humor told by Frank and Igor.

The fifth season premiered on 14 October 2022.

Cast

Main 
 Freddy Ortega as Frank
 Germán Ortega as Igor

Recurring 
 Melissa Ortega
 Marcos Radosh
 Lenny Zundel
 Claudio Herrera as Cuico
 Jocelin Zuckerman
 Nora Velázquez

Episodes

Series overview

Season 1 (2020)

Season 2 (2021)

Season 3 (2021–22)

Season 4 (2022)

Season 5 (2022)

References

External links 
 

Las Estrellas original programming
Mexican television sitcoms
Television series by Televisa
2020 Mexican television series debuts
Spanish-language television shows